7th SLGFCA Awards
December 20, 2010

Best Film: 
The Social Network

Best Director: 
David Fincher
The Social Network
The 7th St. Louis Film Critics Association Awards were announced on December 20, 2010.

Winners and nominees

Best Actor
 Javier Bardem – Biutiful
 Jeff Bridges – True Grit
 Jesse Eisenberg – The Social Network
 Colin Firth – The King's Speech
 James Franco – 127 Hours

Best Actress
 Nicole Kidman – Rabbit Hole
 Jennifer Lawrence – Winter's Bone
 Natalie Portman – Black Swan
 Noomi Rapace – The Girl with the Dragon Tattoo
 Naomi Watts – Fair Game

Best Animated Film
 Despicable Me
 How to Train Your Dragon
 Legend of the Guardians: The Owls of Ga'Hoole
 Tangled
 Toy Story 3

Best Director
 Darren Aronofsky – Black Swan
 Danny Boyle – 127 Hours
 David Fincher – The Social Network
 Tom Hooper – The King's Speech
 Christopher Nolan – Inception

Best Documentary Film
 A Film Unfinished
 Restrepo
 The Tillman Story
 Waiting for "Superman"
 Waking Sleeping Beauty

Best Film
 Black Swan
 The Fighter
 Inception
 The King's Speech
 The Social Network

Best Comedy
 Easy A
 I Love You Phillip Morris
 Jackass 3D
 Micmacs
 Scott Pilgrim vs. the World

Best Foreign Language Film
 Biutiful • Mexico
 The Girl with the Dragon Tattoo (Män som hatar kvinnor) • Sweden
 Micmacs (Micmacs à tire-larigot) • France
 North Face (Nordwand) • Germany
 A Prophet (Un prophète) • France

Best Music
 Black Swan
 Burlesque
 The Fighter
 Inception
 The Social Network

Best Original Screenplay
 Biutiful – Alejandro González Iñárritu, Armando Bo and Nicolás Giacobone
 Black Swan – Mark Heyman, Andres Heinz and John McLaughlin
 The Fighter – Scott Silver, Paul Tamasy and Eric Johnson
 Inception – Christopher Nolan
 The King's Speech – David Seidler

Best Adapted Screenplay
 127 Hours – Simon Beaufoy and Danny Boyle
 Scott Pilgrim vs. the World – Edgar Wright and Michael Bacall
 The Social Network – Aaron Sorkin
 True Grit – Joel and Ethan Coen
 Winter's Bone – Debra Granik and Anne Rosellini

Best Supporting Actor
 Christian Bale – The Fighter
 John Hawkes – Winter's Bone
 Jeremy Renner – The Town
 Sam Rockwell – Conviction
 Geoffrey Rush – The King's Speech

Best Supporting Actress
 Amy Adams – The Fighter
 Helena Bonham Carter – The King's Speech
 Barbara Hershey – Black Swan
 Melissa Leo – The Fighter
 Hailee Steinfeld – True Grit

Best Visual Effects
 Harry Potter and the Deathly Hallows – Part 1
 Inception
 Kick-Ass
 Scott Pilgrim vs. the World
 Tron: Legacy

Moving the Medium Forward
(for technical/artistic innovative that advances the medium)
 127 Hours
 Inception
 Kick-Ass
 Scott Pilgrim vs. the World
 Toy Story 3
 Uncle Boonmee Who Can Recall His Past Lives

Best Artistic/Creative Film
(for excellence in art-house cinema)
 The King's Speech
 Micmacs
 Scott Pilgrim vs. the World
 Trash Humpers
 Winter's Bone

Special Merit
(for best scene, cinematic technique or other memorable aspect or moment)
 127 Hours: the zoom-up scene which begins with a tight shot on Aron (James Franco) as he is screaming and pulls out to a wide shot of a large land area, showing how isolated he was from other humans.
 Easy A: the John Hughes tribute near the beginning.
 Harry Potter and the Deathly Hallows – Part 1: the “obliviate” scene in which Hermione erases her parents’ memories of her.
 Inception: the zero-gravity hotel fight in the tumbling hallway scene with Joseph Gordon-Levitt.
 Kick-Ass: the Hit-Girl kill spree.

References

External links
 Official website

2010
2010 film awards
2010 in Missouri
St Louis

fr:6e cérémonie des St. Louis Film Critics Association Awards